The American Music Awards for Video of the Year has been awarded since 2016. Years reflect the year in which the awards were presented, for works released in the previous year (until 2003 onward when awards were handed out in November of the same year). In 2019, the award's name became Favorite Music Video.

Winners and nominees

2010s

2020s

Category facts

Multiple wins
 3 wins
 Taylor Swift

Multiple nominations
 3 nominations
 Drake
 Lil Nas X
 Taylor Swift

 2 nominations
 Ariana Grande
 Cardi B
 Bruno Mars
 The Weeknd

See also
 American Music Award for Favorite Pop/Rock Video (1984-1988)
 American Music Award for Favorite Pop/Rock Male Video Artist (1985-1987)
 American Music Award for Favorite Pop/Rock Female Video Artist (1985-1987)
 American Music Award for Favorite Pop/Rock Band/Duo/Group Video Artist (1985-1987)
 American Music Award for Favorite Soul/R&B Video (1984-1988)
 American Music Award for Favorite Soul/R&B Male Video Artist (1985-1987)
 American Music Award for Favorite Soul/R&B Female Video Artist (1985-1987)
 American Music Award for Favorite Soul/R&B Band/Duo/Group Video Artist (1985-1987)
 American Music Award for Favorite Country Video (1984-1988)
 American Music Award for Favorite Country Male Video Artist (1985-1987)
 American Music Award for Favorite Country Female Video Artist (1985-1987)
 American Music Award for Favorite Country Band/Duo/Group Video Artist (1985-1987)

References

American Music Awards
American music video awards
Awards established in 2016